Artur Elezarov (born 28 March 1974) is a Moldovan former backstroke swimmer. He competed in two events at the 1996 Summer Olympics.

References

External links
 

1974 births
Living people
Moldovan male backstroke swimmers
Olympic swimmers of Moldova
Swimmers at the 1996 Summer Olympics
Place of birth missing (living people)
20th-century Moldovan people
21st-century Moldovan people